I-pin may refer to:

 Yibin, China, formerly romanized as I-pin
 i-PIN, an internet registration system in South Korea